Acriopsis emarginata, commonly known as the pale chandelier orchid, is a species of orchid endemic to Queensland. It is a clump-forming epiphyte with dark green leaves and curved, branching flower stems with many white and cream-coloured flowers.

Description
Acriopsis emarginata is an epiphyte which forms dense clumps with the pseudobulbs surrounded by thin white roots. The petals are linear to egg-shaped with similar dimensions to the lateral sepals. The lateral lobes are broadly triangular and the middle lobe is short with two prominent calli. Flowering mainly occurs from June to November.

Taxonomy and naming
Acriopsis emarginata was first formally described in 2006 by David Jones and Mark Clements from a specimen collected in the Daintree River valley and the description was published in Australian Orchid Research. The genus name is derived from the Ancient Greek words akris meaning "grasshopper" and opsis meaning "appearance" or "aspect", referring to the grashopper-like appearance of the column.
The specific epithet (emarginata) is a Latin word meaning "notched at the apex", referring to the notch on the labellum callus.

This species was formerly included with Acriopsis javanica but Australian plants are more robust with larger pseudobulbs and leaves and more highly branched flowering stems.

Distribution and habitat
The pale chandelier orchid is widespread and common in tropical Queensland from Cape York to the Daintree River. It grows near the crown of trees, palms and Pandanus.

Conservation status
Acriopsis emarginata is listed as "vulnerable" under the Australian Government Environment Protection and Biodiversity Conservation Act 1999 and the Queensland Government Nature Conservation Act 1992.

Use in horticulture 
Easy to grow, but needs water all year round, high humidity, and warmth (not below 10 °C). Can be grown on a slab or in a small pot with a coarse mix.

References 

Orchids of Australia
Flora of Queensland
Epiphytic orchids
Cymbidiinae
Plants described in 2016